Snowshoe Glacier is a glacier 8 nautical miles (15 km) long flowing west from a col in the southwest flank of Neny Glacier into Neny Fjord, western Graham Land. Roughly surveyed from the ground (1936) and photographed from the air (1937) by British Graham Land Expedition (BGLE). Surveyed by Falkland Islands Dependencies Survey (FIDS) in 1949. The name was suggested by K.S.P. Butler of the FIDS in 1948 because the shape of the glacier with its narrow head and wide mouth resembles a snowshoe.

Glaciers of Fallières Coast